Sayed Jafar Naderi (born 1965) is an ethnic Hazara-Ismaili who controlled Baghlan Province of Afghanistan during the early 1990s. He was born in Kayan, Baghlan and is also known as Sayyid-e Kayan  The son of Sayed Mansoor Naderi, The previous Vice-President of Afghanistan, Sayed Jafar Naderi went to school in England at age 10, after his father was made a political prisoner. He was sent to the United States at age 13 where he became known as Jeff Naderi.

Biography 
Prior to his father calling him back to Afghanistan, he lived in Allentown, Pennsylvania, played drums in a heavy metal band and was an athlete.

According to The World's Most Dangerous Places, Jafar was rich when he returned to Afghanistan. He is considered one of the country's most brutal and notorious warlords.

He was quoted in The World's Most Dangerous Places as saying that he came to help the people of Baghlan, and the rest of the country. He risked his life to help his people, inspired by his father and grandfather who helped protect Afghanistan.

During the Soviet occupation of Afghanistan Jafar became Baghlan's MP. His army fought the Soviets, producing a stream of refugees who fled to Pakistan. Few returned until after the Taliban government fell.

The 80th Division (Afghanistan) was reportedly formed from tribal militia in the second half of the Soviet–Afghan War. In 1989 it was the major formation in Baghlan Province, under Jafar's command, then 25 years old.

Jafar was the subject of the 1989 documentary "Warlord of Kayan" produced and directed by Jeff B. Harmon. The film won the Golden Gate Award at the San Francisco International Film Festival.

Family political background
Sayed Jafar Naderi comes from a highly political family background. His father Sayed Mansur Naderi has been both the religious and political leader of Afghan Ismaili sector in the past 50 years. Jafar's younger brother Sadat Mansoor Naderi who is a business person has been nominated for the post of Urban Development Minister by the president Ashraf Ghani Ahmadzai. Sayed Jafar's younger sister Farkhunda Zahra Naderi is a member of Afghan Parliament and a well-known rights activist in the country. His one cousin Sayed Dawood Naderi is another parliamentarian elected from Kunduz province of Afghanistan.

Jafar himself was appointed as security advisor to first vice president Abdul Rashid Dostum.

See also 
 Sayed Mansur Naderi
 Sadat Mansoor Naderi
 Farkhunda Zahra Naderi
 Sayed Kayan

Footnotes

External links 
 Website devoted to Naderi
 Afghan Ismailis Website

Afghan Ismailis
1965 births
Living people
Governors of Baghlan Province
Hazara politicians
20th-century Ismailis
21st-century Ismailis